La Revue critique des idées et des livres was a French journal of political and literary criticism from 1908 to 1924. It was established by  Jean Rivain and Eugène Marsan. It was influenced by the ideas of the Action Française.
From 1908 Lucien Moreau and Jean Rivain were the key contributors to the review.

References

Sources

1908 establishments in France
1924 disestablishments in France